Anna of Brunswick-Grubenhagen-Einbeck (1414 – 4 April 1474) was a daughter of Duke Eric I of Brunswick-Grubenhagen and his wife, Elisabeth of Brunswick-Göttingen.

Anna's first marriage was with Duke Albert III of Bavaria.  They had the following children:
 John IV (1437–1463), Duke of Bavaria
 Ernest (1438–1460)
 Sigismund of Bavaria (1439–1501)
 Albert (1440–1445)
 Margaretha (1442–1479), married in 1463 with Marquess Frederick I of Mantua (1441–1484)
 Elisabeth (1443–1484), married in 1460 with Elector Ernest of Saxony (1441–1486)
 Albert IV (1447–1508)
 Christopher (1449–1483)
 Wolfgang (1451–1514)
 Barbara, a nun in Munich

After Albert's death, she married Duke Frederick III of Brunswick-Calenberg-Göttingen.  This marriage remained childless.

Ancestors 

1414 births
1474 deaths
15th-century German people
15th-century German women
Duchesses of Bavaria
House of Welf
Burials at Andechs Abbey
Daughters of monarchs
Remarried royal consorts